The 24th Lancers was a cavalry regiment of the British Army that existed from late 1940 to mid-1944. Assigned to the 8th Armoured Brigade, the regiment fought during the Invasion of Normandy before being disbanded in July 1944. After disbandment, the regiment's personnel were sent to other cavalry regiments as reinforcements.

History 
The regiment was raised in December 1940 from a cadre of personnel taken from the 9th Queen's Royal Lancers and the 17th/21st Lancers; despite its numerical designation, the regiment shared no lineage with the earlier 24th Light Dragoons. It was initially assigned to the 29th Armoured Brigade, which formed part of the 11th Armoured Division, but it was reassigned to the 8th Armoured Brigade on 8 February 1944.

With the 8th Armoured Brigade, the regiment landed on Gold Beach, in the second wave of the Operation Overlord landings, supporting the 50th (Northumbrian) Infantry Division. The regiment landed on 7 June 1944 (D+1). Equipped with Sherman tanks, shortly after landing the regiment was involved in the fighting around Putot-en-Bessin and Villers Bocage. After intensive action in the Tilly-sur-Seulles, Fontenay-le-Pesnel, Tessel Wood and Rauray areas, the regiment was disbanded towards the end of July 1944 due to heavy casualties and limited reinforcements, and its personnel were transferred to other regiments. Most of these men went to the 23rd Hussars or other units of the 8th Armoured Brigade, or the 29th Armoured Brigade in the 11th Armoured Division. Since D-Day, the regiment had lost 41 officers and men killed in action, along with 98 wounded or missing.

Battle honours 
The 24th Lancers was awarded the following battle honours for service in the Second World War:
Putot en Bessin, Villers Bocage, Tilly sur Seulles, The Odon, Fontenay le Pesnil, Defence of Rauray, North-West Europe 1944

References

Bibliography

External links

Cavalry regiments of the British Army
Lancers 024
1940 establishments in the United Kingdom
Military units and formations established in 1940
Military units and formations disestablished in 1944